Morningside is a commercial and residential suburb of Johannesburg, South Africa, located in Region E of the City of Johannesburg Metropolitan Municipality. As a part of the former Sandton municipality, it constitutes many affluent residential areas as well as small and medium business enterprises, clinics, schools, hotels and shopping centres.

History
The suburb is situated on part of an old Witwatersrand farm called Zandfontein. It was established on 8 March 1950. The suburb may be named for a suburb of the same name in southern Edinburgh, Scotland, UK.

References

External links

 Morningside - Seeff Properties

Johannesburg Region E